James Brown (1724–1786) was a Church of Scotland minister who served as Moderator of the General Assembly in 1777.

Life

He was baptised on 17 December 1724 the youngest son of Rev James Brown of Abercorn. He studied at the University of Edinburgh, graduating MA in 1742. He was licensed to preach by the Presbytery of Perth in July 1745.

He was ordained as minister of Melrose Parish Church in February 1748. In 1767 he translated to New Greyfriars in Edinburgh in place of Rev John Erskine. In November 1768 he moved to New (West) Kirk, St Giles on the Royal Mile in Edinburgh.

He was elected Moderator of the General Assembly of the Church of Scotland in 1777 in place of Rev John Ker of Forfar.

In 1785 he is listed as living at "Laurieston": the district close to George Heriot's School south of the town centre.

He died on 6 May 1786.

Family

In June 1748 he married Helen Drummond (died 1754) third daughter of Captain Lawrence Drummond. Their children included:

John (1749–1757)
Katharine (1750–1752)
Elizabeth (1751–1764)
Helen (born 1754) married John Pattison, advocate

Helen died a month after giving birth to Helen. In November 1755 Brown married Marion Tod (died 1786), daughter of Robert Tod, an Edinburgh merchant. Their children included:

Janet (1756–1759)
Margaret (1757–1768)
Robert Brown of Kirklands WS (1758–1812) apprenticed to his in-law Thomas Tod
Rev James Brown, minister of Newburn (possibly the twin of Robert)
John (1761–1767)
Thomas (1766–1801) Edinburgh merchant
Marion Brown (born 1771) married John Gray of Newholm WS

Publications

The Extensive Influence of Religious Knowledge (1769)
Plan for Regulating the Charity Workhouse

References
 

1724 births
1786 deaths
People from East Lothian
Alumni of the University of Edinburgh
Ministers of St Giles' Cathedral
Moderators of the General Assembly of the Church of Scotland